Un Canto de México (Song of Mexico; also known as 100 Años de Música Mexicana, 100 years of Mexican music; and Bellas Artes En Vivo, Fine Arts in concert) is the tenth album by Mexican singer Alejandro Fernández.  It was recorded during a performance in the concert hall of the "Palacio de Bellas Artes".  The concert paid tribute to Mexico's greatest singers and songwriters of some of the great Mexican songs of the last century.

Track listing

CD1
Obertura "Las Tres Raíces" (Eduardo Magallanes, Juventino Rosas, Antonio Soler) – 1:26
Alejandra (Enrique Mora) – 3:20
Nunca (Guty Cárdenas, Ricardo López Méndez) – 2:42
Morenita Mía (Armando Villarreal) – 3:34
Júrame (María Grever) – 4:23
Norteña De Mis Amores (Ricardo García Arellano) – 1:48
Ojos Tapatíos (José Elizondo Sagredo, Fernando Méndez Velázquez) – 3:30
Popurrí Agustín Lara (Noche De Ronda, Solamente Una Vez) (Agustín Lara) – 5:42
Granada (Agustín Lara) – 5:15
Popurrí Boleros (Reloj, El Andariego, Cuando Ya No Me Quieras, Si Dios Me Quita La Vida, Perfidia, Bonita, Luz y Sombra) (Roberto Cantoral; Álvaro Carrillo; Los Cuates Castilla; Luis Demetrio; Alberto Domínguez; Luis Alcaráz; Rafael Cárdenas, Rubén Fuentes) – 12:22
Como Yo Te Amé (Armando Manzanero) – 3:21
Bésame Mucho (Consuelo Velázquez) – 4:06

CD2
Ella (José Alfredo Jiménez) – 1:59
De Un Mundo Raro (José Alfredo Jiménez) – 3:35
Cuando El Destino (José Alfredo Jiménez) – 2:30
Popurrí Bravío (Tú, Sólo Tú; Fallaste Corazón, Pelea De Gallos, Juan Charrasqueado, Cielo Rojo, No volveré) (Felipe Valdés Leal; Cuco Sánchez; Juan S. Garrido; Víctor Cordero; Juan Zaizar; José Alfredo Jiménez) – 9:04
Amanecí Entre Tus Brazos (José Alfredo Jiménez) – 3:29
Paloma Querida (José Alfredo Jiménez) – 1:34
Serenata Huasteca (José Alfredo Jiménez) – 1:51
Popurrí Vicente Fernández (Las Llaves De Mi Alma, Por Tu Maldito Amor, Mujeres Divinas, De Qué Manera Te Olvido) (Vicente Fernández; Federico Méndez; Martín Urieta; Federico Méndez) – 7:44
Popurrí Juan Gabriel (Ya Lo Sé Que Tú Te Vas, La Differencia, Te Sigo Amando) (Juan Gabriel) – 8:18
Huapango (José Pablo Moncayo) – 8:37

Chart performance

Sales and certifications

References

Alejandro Fernández live albums
2002 live albums
Spanish-language live albums